Hannah Alcorn (born May 10, 1990) is an American voice actress. She works in voice acting, appearing in English dubs for Japanese anime series, as well as movies and video games.

Career 
She began acting on stage at the age of 11 and has been working professionally since the age of 18. Hannah has recently ventured into the anime industry as a voice actress, and can be heard in her first two principal roles for ADV Films, the sweet-but-bumbling witch hunter Marin Nijihara in Magikano, and as the lead female character Sunako in the new Shinichi Watanabe comedy The Wallflower.

Filmography

Anime
 Blue Drop - Michiko Kozuki
 Dragon Ball - Girl (ep. 26), Yamcha's Fanclub (ep. 44), Reporter (ep. 123) Blonde Woman (ep. 134) (Funimation Dub)
 Dragon Ball Z - Princess Snake's Maid (Ep. 14), Daughter (Ep. 21), East City Civilian (Ep. 21) (Funimation Dub)
 Hunter × Hunter (2011) - Female Receptionist (ep 29), Additional Voices
 Magikano - Marin Nijihara
 Outbreak Company - Luna (Ep. 10), Additional Voices
 Tears to Tiara - Riannon, Primula
 The Wallflower - Sunako Nakahara
 UFO Ultramaiden Valkyrie - Catgirl Weirdo

Live-action
 The Age of Shadows - Kim Sa-Hee

Video games
 Mary Skelter: Nightmares - Cinderella
 Mary Skelter 2 - Cinderella
 Mary Skelter: Finale - Cinderella

References

External links
 

Living people
Actresses from Houston
American video game actresses
American voice actresses
University of Houston alumni
1990 births
21st-century American actresses